Miodrag Kovačić (born 31 July 1965) is a Serbian weightlifter. He competed at the 1996 Summer Olympics in Atlanta in Men's Featherweight. Kovačić placed 34th out of 36 competitors, lifting a total of 247.5 kg.

References

External links
Miodrag Kovačić - Sports-Reference.com

1965 births
Living people
Serbian male weightlifters
Olympic weightlifters of Yugoslavia
Weightlifters at the 1996 Summer Olympics
Yugoslav male weightlifters